USS John F. Kennedy  may refer to:

, an aircraft carrier in commission from 1968 to 2007
, a  launched in 2019.

See also

United States Navy ship names